In mathematics, the concept of groupoid algebra generalizes the notion of group algebra.

Definition 
The product is then extended by linearity.

Examples 
Some examples of groupoid algebras are the following:
 Group rings
 Matrix algebras
 Algebras of functions

Properties 
 When a groupoid has a finite number of objects and a finite number of morphisms, the groupoid algebra is a direct sum of tensor products of group algebras and matrix algebras.

See also 
 Hopf algebra
 Partial group algebra

Notes

References 
 
 
 
 

Algebra